Humanitarian Defence (HD) is a Wyoming registered  Non-Profit Organization. Its first major mission was in the aftermath of the 2010 Haiti earthquake.

References
 Ison, Jona: "Called to action in Haiti" March 20, 2010
Gibson, Elizabeth: "Smaller charities sometimes ill-prepared for relief work" March 10, 2010 
Wyoming Secretary of State
Holder, Deborah : "Personal Security on a Global Scale" Dougals Budget January 25, 2006

External links
 Humanitarian Defense Official Website
 GuideStar
 Abundance International Official Website
 Center for Expeditionary Security Training-US
 Executive Security International

Security companies of the United States
Organizations established in 2008
Charities based in Wyoming
Foreign charities operating in Haiti